Kavilan Brandon Pillay (born 1981 or 1982) is a South African politician from Chatsworth, KwaZulu-Natal. As of 2021, he is a Member of the National Assembly of South Africa representing the African National Congress.

Early life and education
Pillay was born into an Indian family in Chatsworth. He attended Chatsworth Secondary School. He graduated from MANCOSA with a Bachelor of Public Administration and later with a Honours degree in public administration. Pillay earned a Master of Public Administration at the University of KwaZulu-Natal in 2021.

Politics
His political activism started in his teenage years, having been influenced by his late father. He became an activist for the Bayview Flat Residents Association and later the African National Congress. Pillay was a student leader, Students' Representative Council president, ward councillor for ward 69 (Chatsworth) from 2011 to 2016, convenor and chairperson of ward 69 ANC branch, secretary of the Lenny Naidu branch and convenor of the regional executive committee's sub-committee on local government, legislature and governance. He also served as the convenor of the youth desk of the South African National Civic Organization. Pillay is currently a member of the ANC's regional task team.

Prior to being sworn in as a Member of Parliament, Pillay had been the chairperson of both the Bayview Flats Residents Association and the Bayview community policing forum, as well as a grant manager for the eThekwini Metropolitan Municipality.

Parliament
Following the death of Advocate Loyiso Mpumlwana in December 2020, the ANC selected Pillay to take up his seat in the National Assembly. Pillay was sworn in on 27 January 2021 during a virtual ceremony at the KwaZulu-Natal Provincial Legislature amid the COVID-19 pandemic in South Africa. Since entering parliament, he has served on the Portfolio Committee on Home Affairs.

References

External links

Profile at Parliament of South Africa

Living people
Year of birth missing (living people)
People from KwaZulu-Natal
University of KwaZulu-Natal alumni
African National Congress politicians
Members of the National Assembly of South Africa
South African politicians of Indian descent
21st-century South African politicians